The 2013 Lehigh Valley Steelhawks season was the third season as a professional indoor football franchise and their first in the Professional Indoor Football League (PIFL). One of 7 teams competing in the PIFL for the 2013 season.

The team played their home games under head coach Chris Thompson at the Stabler Arena in Bethlehem, Pennsylvania. The Steelhawks earned a 7-5 record, placing tied for 2nd in the league, qualifying for the playoffs. They were defeated in the Semifinals, 40-44 by the Richmond Raiders.

Schedule
Key:

Regular season
All start times are local to home team

Postseason

Roster

Division Standings

References

External links
 Lehigh Valley Steelhawks official website

Lehigh Valley Steelhawks
Lehigh Valley Steelhawks
Lehigh Valley Steelhawks